Tangier Incident is a 1953 American thriller film directed by Lew Landers and starring George Brent, Mari Aldon and Dorothy Patrick. It was one of several Hollywood films set in Tangier during the International Zone period.

Plot

Cast
 George Brent as Steve Gordon  
 Mari Aldon as Millicent  
 Dorothy Patrick as Nadine  
 Bert Freed as Kozad  
 Dan Seymour as Police Inspector Rabat  
 Alix Talton as Olga  
 John Harmon as Tony  
 Richard Karlan as Rosnov 
 Shepard Menken as Kravich  
 Benny Rubin as Blalu  
 Michael Ross as Ivan  
 Dayton Lummis as Henry Morrison

References

Bibliography
 Edwards, Brian. Morocco Bound: Disorienting America’s Maghreb, from Casablanca to the Marrakech Express. Duke University Press, 2005.

External links

1953 films
American thriller films
1950s thriller films
Films directed by Lew Landers
Allied Artists films
Films set in Tangier
Cold War spy films
Films produced by Lindsley Parsons
American black-and-white films
1950s English-language films
1950s American films